Who Saw Her Die? is an Italian giallo film directed by Aldo Lado and Vittorio De Sisti, starring Anita Strindberg and George Lazenby. Lazenby and Strindberg play the parents of a murdered girl, who pursue her black-veiled killer throughout Venice. Who Saw Her Die? features music by Ennio Morricone, and has seen positive reviews for Lazenby's performance.

Plot

In a French ski resort, a young girl wanders off from her carer and is murdered by a killer in a black veil, who buries her body in the snow. Years later, another young girl, Roberta Serpieri, is found drowned in Venice after being abducted by the same killer. Her divorced parents, sculptor Franco and Elizabeth, attempt to discover what has happened to their daughter.

Cast

 George Lazenby as Franco Serpieri
 Anita Strindberg as Elizabeth Serpieri
 Adolfo Celi as Serafian
 Dominique Boschero as Ginevra Storelli
 Peter Chatel as Philip Vernon
 Piero Vida as Journalist
 Jose Quaglio as Bonaluti
 Alessandro Haber as Father James
 Nicoletta Elmi as Roberta Serpieri
 Rosemarie Lindt as Gabriella
 Giovanni Forti Rosselli as Francois Roussel
 Sandro Grinfan as Inspector De Donati

Production
Who Saw Her Die? was written by Massimo D'Avack, Francesco Barilli, Aldo Lado and Rüdiger von Spiehs; it was directed by Lado and Vittorio De Sisti. The film's music was composed by Ennio Morricone, whose score was released separately in 1972.

The film was shot on location in Venice; one of the film's chase scenes was filmed at the Molino Stucky flour mill, a run-down building which was later renovated as a Hilton hotel in 2008.

In both the Italian and English versions, Lazenby's voice is dubbed by other actors.
Italian films were rarely shot with usable sound and dubbed in post-production.
For the English version, Lazenby was dubbed by American actor Michael Forest.

Release and reception
Who Saw Her Die? was also distributed under the title of The Child.

In his book Italian Horror Film Directors, Louis Paul has described Lazenby's performance as one of the actor's best, although he regretted that some dubs of the film did not use Lazenby's voice. Danny Shipka, author of Perverse Titillation, compared the film stylistically to Nicolas Roeg's later film Don't Look Now, which shares a Venetian setting. Shipka noted that Lado avoided the explicit gore and sexual elements usually present in a giallo film, instead focussing on "an aura of uneasiness". Buzz McClain of AllMovie awarded Who Saw Her Die? three-and-a-half stars out of five, highlighting Lazenby's performance and Morricone's score; McClain felt that the film's plot was unnecessarily complicated, but that this was compensated for by its setting and cinematography.

Footnotes

References

External links
 

1970s thriller films
Italian thriller films
German thriller films
West German films
1970s Italian-language films
Films set in Venice
Giallo films
Films directed by Aldo Lado
Films shot in Venice
Films shot in France
Films scored by Ennio Morricone
1970s serial killer films
1970s Italian films
1970s German films